Dawn of Reprisal is the second album by Malefice released in February 2009 on Metal Blade Records, produced by WellerHill.

Track listing
 "The Midas Effect" - 3:47
 "Abandon Hope" - 4:03
 "An Architect Of Your Demise" - 4:13
 "End Of Days" - 4:15
 "Human Portrait" - 3:35
 "As I Bleed" - 4:53
 "When Embers Ignite" - 3:21 
 "Retribution" - 4:33
 "Hatred Justified" - 5:02 
 "Sickened" - 4:22

Personnel 
 Dale Butler - Vocals
 Ben Symons - Guitars
 Alex Vuskans - Guitars
 Thomas Hynes - Bass
 Craig Thomas - Drums

References 

2009 albums
Malefice albums
Metal Blade Records albums
Albums produced by Dan Weller